Angelique Widjaja was the defending champion but did not complete in the Juniors this year.

Vera Dushevina defeated Maria Sharapova in the final, 4–6, 6–1, 6–2 to win the girls' singles tennis title at the 2002 Wimbledon Championships.

Seeds

 n/a
  Hsieh Su-wei (first round)
  Barbora Strýcová (second round)
  Eva Birnerová (third round)
  Petra Cetkovská (first round)
  Anna-Lena Grönefeld (second round)
  Maria Sharapova (final)
  Vera Dushevina (champion)
  Silvana Bauer (third round)
  Maria Kirilenko (semifinals)
  Andreja Klepač (second round)
  Anna Bastrikova (quarterfinals)
  Samantha Stosur (first round, retired)
  Ally Baker (third round)
  Cory Ann Avants (quarterfinals)
  Tatiana Golovin (semifinals)

Draw

Finals

Top half

Section 1

Section 2

Bottom half

Section 3

Section 4

References

External links

Girls' Singles
Wimbledon Championship by year – Girls' singles